Döllük is a village in the Şarkışla district of Sivas province, Turkey.

References

Villages in Sivas Province